The 1920 presidential election in Texas was part of the 1920 United States presidential election in which all contemporary forty-eight states voted on November 2, 1920. State voters chose 20 electors, or representatives to the Electoral College, who voted for president and vice president.

Background
Ever since statehood, Texas had been very nearly the strongest state for the Democratic Party owing to its initial history being as a Deep South state based around slavery. Even during Reconstruction when African-Americans were briefly enfranchised, the Republican Party won just one statewide election, and after Redemption and the passing of a new constitution in 1876 the GOP became confined largely to areas of abolitionist German refugee settlement in the Hill Country, and to a few South Texas counties where local Republican bosses could outcompete their Democratic equivalents. The Terrell Election Law created a poll tax that, from 1902, disenfranchised virtually all remaining African-American voters, the vast majority of Mexican Americans, and also most poor whites. Voter turnout among males over twenty-one fell from over eighty percent to under thirty percent following the poll tax.

The period following this disfranchisement nonetheless saw a considerable amount of typically "Progressive" reform under Governors James Stephen Hogg and Thomas M. Campbell, and despite this progressive faction ceding power in 1906 to the conservatives, Texas proved solid in its support for progressive candidate Woodrow Wilson at the 1912 Democratic National Convention. Another populist, James Ferguson, took the governorship in 1914 on an anti-Prohibition platform, but was impeached for misappropriation of public funds. Nonetheless, this impeachment actually was to spur James to run in the ensuing presidential election, although despite attempting to do so he did not obtain ballot access in any of the other forty-seven states.

The 1916 presidential election had seen Democrat Woodrow Wilson establish firmer control over the machine-dominated areas of South Texas, but hostility towards Wilson's peace promises caused some losses amongst the German population, where Lee County went Republican for the first time. By the time the 1920 presidential election season was to begin, President Wilson was hated by German and Irish Americans for his entry into the war and his role in drafting the Treaty of Versailles and supporting many anti-German groups during the "Red Scare". His League of Nations proposal was also opposed in the South where isolationism had long been very powerful.

Vote
Despite the hostility towards Wilson and James M. Cox – who had banned German-language instruction in public schools as Governor of Ohio – amongst German-Americans and some isolationists, Texas was too solidly Democratic for there to be any threat from even the largest popular-vote landslide in United States presidential election history. It is true that Cox' performance was the worst by a Democrat since the complete disfranchisement of Texas' black population by the 1902 poll tax, but losses from hostility to Wilsonian foreign policy were much less pronounced than in French Louisiana or the Ozarks.

Favorite son James E. Ferguson, running on the "American" ticket, gained considerable support amongst those tenants and small-scale owners in East and Central Texas who could pay the poll tax, but these were few enough that he did not crack double figures for the state as a whole, and his presence cut into support for imprisoned Socialist Eugene V. Debs. His performance in Texas made it his strongest state.

This would be the last occasion that Zapata County would vote for a Republican presidential candidate until the 2020 election, as it would become the last South Texas machine county to be turned over to Democratic control.

Results

Results by county

See also
 United States presidential elections in Texas

Notes

References

Texas
1920